The Evidence by Commission Act 1885 (48 & 49 Vict. c. 74) was an Act of the Parliament of the United Kingdom. It became law on 14 August 1885. It was one of the Evidence Acts 1806 to 1895.

It provided that when a court issued a commission for the examination of a witness outside its jurisdiction, the judge or court it was addressed to could appoint a fit person (in a civil case) or, in a criminal case, a judge or magistrate of that court or an inferior court, to take the examination of the witness. The Evidence by Commission Act 1859 was amended to apply to proceedings under this act, granting the power to make rules for the remuneration of the examiner and any costs incurred. It also stipulated that the witness could be examined under oath, affirmation, or by any other appropriate means provided by the law of the place where they were examined.

It applied throughout India and the Colonies, and elsewhere in the Dominions; in effect, throughout the British Empire.

References
Oliver & Boyd's new Edinburgh almanac and national repository for the year 1886. Oliver & Boyd, Edinburgh, 1886

United Kingdom Acts of Parliament 1885
1885 in British law